Njebi (or Nzebi, Njabi, Yinjebi) is a Bantu language spoken in Gabon and the Republic of Congo.

Example
Gabonese singer SeBa's writes and sings her songs in the Njebi language.

References

Languages of Gabon
Nzebi languages
Languages of the Republic of the Congo